This is a list of railway stations in County Durham, with estimated usage figures gathered from data collected by the Office of Rail and Road (ORR). As of July 2020, there are 17 stations located within County Durham, from which around 6.47 million passenger journeys were made during 2018–19. Note that Horden station opened in 2020 so received no entries and exits in the period covered by the data.

Gallery

References

See also 
 List of railway stations in County Durham
 List of busiest railway stations in Great Britain

 
Busiest railway stations in County Durham